Model Engine was an alternative rock band based in Santa Barbara, California.  Prior to 1997 the trio, consisting of Jeremy Post, Brad McCarter and Brent Nims were known as Black Eyed Sceva. Confusion over the meaning of the name and its constant mispronunciation led the band to change its moniker when drummer Erik Herzog replaced Nims prior to the release of the group's third album.  They disbanded in 2000.

Influenced by artists as diverse as The Police, Rush and Uncle Tupelo, Model Engine/Black Eyed Sceva's music was a blend of alternative rock, grunge, and progressive rock.  All of the group's albums were recorded and released under the 5 Minute Walk label and produced by Bruce Winter, an associate of Toad the Wet Sprocket.

Black Eyed Sceva 
As Black Eyed Sceva the band released two commercially unsuccessful but critically acclaimed albums, Way Before the Flood (1994) and the EP 5 Years, 50,000 Miles Davis (1995).  As a lyricist Post addressed provocative and intellectually challenging issues from a Christian viewpoint.  Among the topics covered were premarital sex ("Mudhouse"), divorce and child abandonment ("Adrien James"), secular philosophy ("Comte's Perspective"), homosexuality and AIDS ("Handshake"), church divisions ("Ecumenical") and post-modern Christian media hype ("Soapbox").  The song "Twain" was an unapologetic assault on Mark Twain's book Letters from the Earth.

Model Engine 
As Model Engine, The Lean Years Tradition (1997) continued the band's exploration of dark themes, including Christian martyrdom ("Hang You Upside Down"), prostitution ("Reeperbahn," based on the band's experiences in Hamburg) and pornography ("Anonymous F").

Discography

Black Eyed Sceva 
 Way Before the Flood – (1995, 5 Minute Walk)
 5 Years, 50,000 Miles Davis [EP] – (1996, 5 Minute Walk)

Model Engine 
 The Lean Years Tradition – (1997, 5 Minute Walk)

Members 
 Jeremy Post – guitar, vocals
 Brad McCarter – bass, vocals
 Brent Nims – drums
 Erik Herzog – drums

External links 
 Black Eyed Sceva on MusicBrainz
 Model Engine on MusicBrainz

Christian rock groups from California
Musical groups established in 1994

ca:Micromotor